Rechnoye is a rural locality (a selo) in Yuzhny Selsoviet, Kizlyarsky District, Republic of Dagestan, Russia. The population was 370 as of 2010. There are 7 streets. Selo was based in 1967.

Geography 
Rechnoye is located 3 km south of Yuzhnoye, 8 km south of Kizlyar. Yuzhnoye and Kizlyar are the nearest rural localities.

Nationalities 
Russians, Rutuls, Tsakhurs, Lezgins, Dargins and Avars live there.

References 

Rural localities in Kizlyarsky District